The following list contains songs produced, co-produced or remixed by Hip hop producer Statik Selektah

2001

Reks – Along Came The Chosen
14. "Work" (feat. Lucky Dice, B. Knox, & Rip Shop)

2004

KRS-One – Keep Right
 23. "The Cutclusion"

Krumbsnatcha – Let The Truth Be Told
01. "Statik Selektah Intro"

Statik Selektah & Nas – The Prophecy
03. "Wiseguys" (feat. Styles P)
24. "You Know My Style (Showoff Remix)"

2005

O.C. – Starchild
 01. "Intro"
 13. "Outro"

2006

G-Unit – The Empire Strikes Back
03. "The Grind" (50 Cent featuring The Notorious B.I.G.)
04. "Who Dat" (M.O.P. & Young Buck)
05. "Every Time" (Statik Selektah featuring Mobb Deep & Termanology)
06. "I Can't Wait (Have A Party Pt. 2)" (Mobb Deep featuring 50 Cent)
12. "50 This, 50 That" (50 Cent featuring M.O.P.)
14. "We Killin' Em (Young Buck)
20. "Curious (Remix) – Live from the Bahamas" (Tony Yayo)

Termanology – Hood Politics IV: Show And Prove
06. "Think It Over" (feat. Trife Da God)
12. "Everytime" (feat. Mobb Deep)
22. "Watch Your Back" (feat. Royce Da 5'9" & Ea$y Money)

AZ – The Format
07. "Animal"

Statik Selektah & Nas – The Prophecy Vol. 2 (The Beginning Of The N)
01. "Statik Selektah & Nas Intro"
02. "Don't Hate Me Now (The N Remix)"
12. "Life's Gone Down"

2007

Foxy Brown – Brooklyn's Don Diva
07. "Too Real" (feat. AZ)

Termanology – Hood Politics V
19. "Hardcore" (feat. Reks)

Statik Selektah – Spell My Name Right: The Album
01. "Spell My Name Right (Intro)" (feat. DJ Premier & Termanology)
02. "Stop, Look, Listen" (feat. Styles P, Termanology, & Q-Tip)
03. "Express Yourself '08" (feat. Termanology, Talib Kweli, & Consequence)
04. "6 In The Morning" (feat. Joell Ortiz, Kool G Rap, & Sheek Louch)
05. "What Would You Do!?" (feat. Freeway & Cassidy)
06. "Make A Movie (Interlude)" (feat. DJ Khaled)
07. "Bam Bam" (feat. Red Cafe, Termanology, & Murs)
08. "G-Shit (Showoff Mix)" (feat. Uncle Murda, Sev-One, Termanology, & Jadakiss)
09. "Back Against The Wall" (feat. Royce Da 5'9" & Cormega)
10. "Hardcore (So You Wanna Be)" (feat. Reks & Termanology)
11. "No Mistakes Allowed" (feat. Doug E. Fresh, Tony Touch, Scram Jones, Dp-One, DJ Gi-Joe, DJ Revolution, & Esoteric)
12. "Knockin' Em Out (Interlude)" (feat. Clinton Sparks)
13. "Punch Out" (feat. Big Shug)
14. "The Good Life (Give It Up) (feat. Lil' Fame)
15. "Big Dreamers" (feat. Reks)
16. "No Holding Back" (feat. AZ & Cormega)
17. "Got Me Goin' (Hip Hop)" (feat. Slum Village & Granite State)
18. "Time To Say Goodbye" (feat. Evidence & The Alchemist)
19. "It's Over Now" (feat. Termanology & A.G.)
20. "Talk To Me" (feat. Jon Hope, Reks, & Skyzoo)
21. "Did What We Had To Do (Showoff Mix)" (feat. KRS-One, Larry Cheeba & Large Professor)

2008

ST. da Squad – ST. da Squad
02. "It's The ST."

Reks – Grey Hairs
02. "The One"
04. "How Can It Be"
09. "Black Cream (The Negro Epidemic)" (feat. Big Shug)
10. "Love Sweet Misery"
11. "Rise"
12. "Telescope" (feat. Jon Hope & Lucky Dice)
13. "Day 2"
14. "Premonition" (feat. Termanology & Consequence)
16. "Cry Baby"
18. "Big Dreamers (Lawtown Remix)" (feat. Krumb Snatcha & Termanology)
20. "Pray For Me"

Statik Selektah – Stick 2 the Script
01. "Stick 2 The Script (Intro)"
02. "To The Top (Stick 2 The Script)" (feat. Cassidy, Saigon, & Termanology)
03. "For the City" (feat. M.O.P. & Jadakiss
04. "Get Out the Way" (feat. Bun B & Cory Mo)
05. "All 2gether Now" (feat. Freeway, Peedi Crakk, & Young Chris)
06. "Interlude" (feat. Q-Tip)
07. "Church" (feat. Termanology)
08. "Talkin Bout You (Ladies)" (feat. Skyzoo, Joell Ortiz & Talib Kweli)
09. "On the Marquee" (feat. Little Brother, Joe Scudda, & Chaundon)
10. "Mr. Popularity" (feat. Consequence)
11. "Interlude" (feat. Mad Rapper)
12. "This Is It (Showoff Remix)" (feat. Black Rob, D-Dot, & Redman)
13. "So Good (Live From The Bar)" (feat. Naledge, Reks & CL Smooth)
14. "Streets of M.A." (feat. Masspike Miles, Termanology, SuperSTah Snuk, Slaine, Ea$y Money, Frankie Wainwright, & Smoke Bulga)
15. "Sounds of the Street (Interlude)" (feat. JFK)
16. "Destined to Shine" (feat. Torae, Jon Hope, & Sha Stimuli)
17. "Cali Nights" (feat. Glasses Malone, Mistah F.A.B., & Novel)
18. "Take It All Back" (feat. Reks, Ea$y Money, Royce Da 5'9", & Paula Campbell)

2009

Reks – More Grey Hairs
02. "Play My Music"
04. "Stereotypes" (co-produced by 1914)
05. "Killaz on Wax"
07. "Year Of The Showoff"
11. "Why Do We Say Goodbye"

Various Artists – Midnight Club: Los Angeles South Central – The South Central EP
02. "Rollin' Down The Freeway" (Statik Selektah feat. Glasses Malone, Kali, & Termanology)

Saigon & Statik Selektah – All In A Day's Work
01. "To Be Told..."
02. "So Cruel"
03. "The Rules"
04. "My Crew"
05. "Prepare for War"
06. "Spit"
07. "Lady Sings the Blues"
08. "Lose Her"
09. "Goodbye"
10. "The Reason"
11. "I Warned You"

Krumbsnatcha – Hidden Scriptures
09. "Hidden Scriptures"

M.O.P. – Foundation
06. "Crazy" (feat. Termanology)
08. "Forever & Always"

Termanology – Hood Politics VI: Time Machine
01. "Nobody's Smilin'"
09. "It's A Shame" (feat. Joell Ortiz)

O.C. & A.G. – Oasis
01. "Oasis"

Statik Selektah – Grand Theft Auto IV: The Lost & Damned EP (Special Edition)
01. "Here In Liberty City" (feat. Termanology)
02. "My Favorite Song (Talib Kweli & Reks Remix)" (feat. Talib Kweli & Reks)
05. "I Hear Footsteps" (feat. Consequence)
06. "The Chase Is On" (feat. Skyzoo)
07. "Destined to Shine (Obama Remix)" (feat. Torae, Jon Hope, & Sha Stimuli)

Ghetto – Trunk Music
11. "Star Of Da Show"

Statik Selektah – The Pre-Game EP
01. "The Best" (feat. Reks, Termanology, JFK, & Kali)
02. "Different Day, Same Shit" (feat. JFK, Sha Stimuli, & Skyzoo)
03. "Jaded" (feat. Joe Scudda, Truck North, & Diz Gibran)
04. "Other Than That" (feat. NYG'z)
05. "I'm Wit It (Showoff Remix)" (feat. Talib Kweli & Cory Mo)
06. "Do What I Believe" (feat. Bahamadia)
07. "Dear Mike (Interlude)"
08. "Addicted 2 The Rhythm" (feat. Jon Hope & Novel)
09. "The Facts of Life" (feat. F.T.)

Ape & Undo – Jaw & Order
05. "Primetime" (feat. Statik Selektah)

2010

Mod Sun – The Hippy Hop EP
02. "The Other Side"

Bun B
00. "Best In The World"

Statik Selektah – 100 Proof: The Hangover
01. "Inside A Change (Intro)"
02. "So Close, So Far" (feat. Bun B, Wale, & Colin Munroe)
03. "Critically Acclaimed" (feat. Lil' Fame, Saigon, & Sean Price)
04. "Night People" (feat. Freeway, Red Cafe, & Masspike Miles)
05. "Follow Me" (feat. Smif-n-Wessun)
06. "Do It 2 Death" (feat. Lil' Fame, Havoc, & Kool G Rap)
07. "Come Around" (feat. Termanology & Royce Da 5'9")
08. "Drunken Nights" (feat. Reks, Joe Scudda, & JFK)
09. "Life Is Short" (feat. Consequence)
10. "100 Proof (Interlude)" (feat. JFK)
11. "The Thrill Is Gone" (feat. Styles P & Talib Kweli)
12. "Get Out" (feat. Skyzoo, Big Pooh, Torae, & Lee Wilson)
13. "Laughin'" (feat. Souls of Mischief)
14. "The Coast" (feat. Evidence, Fashawn, & Kali)
15. "Fake Love (Yes Men)" (feat. Reks, Kali, Termanology, & Good Brotha)
16. "Eighty-Two" (feat. Termanology)
17. "Walking Away" (feat. Kali & Novel)

Styles P & DJ Green Lantern – The Green Ghost Project
11. "Shadows"

Joe Scudda – Not Your Average Joe
00. "Catch Up"

Consequence – Movies On Demand
04. "Sounds G.O.O.D. 2 Me"

Boaz – Selling A Dream
00. "What You Know About"

Danny Goines
00. "My Window"

Jared Evan
00. "Not Tonight"

Blacastan – Blac Sabbath
03. "The Dice Life"

Cyhi the Prynce
00. "What's My Name"

Jon Hope
00. "Which One"

Styles P
00. "Sellouts"

Tek – 24Kt Smoke
14. "Toast To The Good Life"

Sonic
00. "Money & Power" (feat. Termanology & Reks)

Wais P
00. "Back Bitches" (feat. Sauce Money)

Josh Xantus
00. "I Don't Care"

7L & Esoteric – 1212
11. "The Most Rotten"

1982 – 1982
01. "The World Renown"
02. "People Are Running"
03. "Things I Dream" (feat. Lil' Fame)
04. "Goin' Back" (feat. Cassidy & Xzibit)
05. "The Radio"
06. "Wedding Bells" (feat. Jared Evan)
07. "You Should Go Home" (feat. Bun B & Masspike Miles)
08. "Tell Me Lies" (feat. Styles P)
09. "Life Is What You Make It" (feat. Saigon & Freeway)
10. "Freedom" (feat. Reks)
11. "Still Waiting"
12. "The Street Life"
13. "Thugathon 2010" (feat. M.O.P.)
14. "The Hood Is On Fire" (feat. Inspectah Deck)
15. "Born In '82"
16. "Help"

Statik Selektah – The Left-Overs (of What's To Come...) EP
01. "No Shame" (feat. Termanology, Ea$y Money, & Wais P)
02. "I Believe That's Me" (feat. Steven King, Slaine, Reks, & JFK)
03. "Make It Seem Easy" (feat. Jon Connor, Kali, & Sonic)
04. "Back On Up" (feat. Strong Arm Steady & Planet Asia)
05. "The Ambition" (feat. Bumpy Knuckles)
06. "The Concept" (feat. Freeway)
07. "Wishing" (feat. Joe Scudda)
08. "On The Corner" (feat. Big Twin, Freddie Gibbs, Tri-State, & Planet Asia)
09. "17" (feat. JFK & Mac Miller)

Slaine – The Devil Never Dies
08. "The Worst"
15. "Settin It Off" (feat. Reks, JFK, Jaysaun, & Steven King)
16. "Trail Of Blood"

Reks – In Between The Lines Vol. 2
07. "Successful Girl" (feat. BK Cyph)
10. "Pray For You (The Homicide Note)
11. "Egos (Outta Control)" (feat. Strong Arm Steady)
18. "Eat Or Starve"
19. "6am" (feat. Steven King, Slaine, & JFK)
22. "The ETC" (feat. Kali)

1982 – 1982: The EP
01. "The Lottery"
02. "All Night" (feat. Kali)
03. "The Darkest Cloud" (feat. Chace Infinite)
04. "Weird Science"
05. "Put It Down" (feat. Ghetto & Ea$y Money)
06. "Never Gonna (Interlude)
07. "Word Up"
08. "The Dream" (feat. Reks)
09. "82-92" (feat. Mac Miller)

AZ – Doe or Die: 15th Anniversary
03. "Gimme Yours (2010)"
06. "The Calm"
07. "Your World Don't Stop (2010)"

Sheek Louch – Donnie G: Don Gorilla
07. "Nite Falls"

Chris Webby – Best In The Burbs
04. "Runaround Webby"
06. "Can't Deny Me"
10. "Get Loose"

1982 – The Evening News EP
01. "Start It Like This"
02. "Money Is Reality" (feat. Action Bronson)
03. "Chill As Hell"
04. "Timothy McVeigh" (feat. Wais P)
05. "Assassins" (feat. Kali & Ghetto)
07. "Baby Mama" (feat. Josh Xantus)
08. "Chasing Diamonds" (feat. Wais P)

2011

Freeway & Statik Selektah – Statik-Free EP
01. "Back At It"
02. "The Flow"
03. "P.A." (feat. Mac Miller)
04. "I'm In The Hood" (feat. Reek da Villain)
05. "From The Street" (feat. Lil' Fame)
06. "And It Don't Quit" (feat. Jakk Frost & Tek)
07. "All Kinds Of 'Em" (feat. The Jacka & Husalah)

Reks – Rhythmatic Eternal King Supreme
05. "This or That"
10. "Mr. Nobody"
14. "Mascara (The Ugly Truth)
15. "Like A Star"
16. "Self Titled"

DJ Deadeye – Substance Abuse
18. "Girl Interrupted" (feat. Termanology & Skyzoo) (co-produced by DJ Deadeye & Termanology)

Freddie Gibbs & Statik Selektah – Lord Giveth, Lord Taketh Away
01. "Intro" (feat. Slaine)
02. "Lord Giveth, Lord Taketh Away"
03. "Rap Money" (feat. Daz Dillinger)
04. "Affiliated" (feat. Reks & Push! Montana)
05. "Wild Style" (feat. Termanology & Fred the Godson)
06. "Already" (feat. Trae tha Truth)
07. "Keep It Warm for Ya" (feat. Smoke DZA & Chace Infinite)

Slaine –  State of Grace
01. "State Of Grace (Intro)"
02. "Don't Talk Greezy"
03. "Offensive Lines" (feat. Action Bronson & Ill Bill)
04. "That's How It Is" (feat. Termanology & Tully Banta-Cain)
05. "Trail Of Blood" (OG Beat Version)
06. "Tonight" (feat. Cyrus DeShield)
07. "Gotta Go" (feat. Kali & D-Stroy)
08. "American Way"
09. "Run It"
10. "Night After Night"
11. "Molly" (feat. D-Stroy)
12. "Hold Up" (feat. Reks)
13. "Concepts" (Freestyle)
14. "Shade 45 Freestyle" (feat. Kali & D-Stroy)
15. "Mistaken Identity"

Slaine – A World with No Skies
08. "The American Way"
10. "Mistaken Identity"

Apathy – Honkey Kong
09. "It's Only Hip Hop"

Evidence – Cats & Dogs
19. "Good Times"

Styles P – Master of Ceremonies
08. "Feelings Gone"

Statik Selektah – Population Control
01. "Population Control" (feat. Sean Price & Termanology)
02. "Play the Game" (feat. Big K.R.I.T. & Freddie Gibbs)
03. "Groupie Love" (feat. Mac Miller & Josh Xantus)
04. "New York, New York" (feat. Styles P, Saigon, & Jared Evan)
05. "Sam Jack" (feat. XV, Jon Connor, & The Kid Daytona)
06. "Never a Dull Moment" (feat. Action Bronson, Termanology, & Bun B)
07. "You're Gone" (feat. Talib Kweli, Colin Munroe, & Lil' Fame)
08. "They Don't Know" (feat. Pill & Reks)
09. "Down" (feat. Push! Montana & Lep Bogus Boys)
10. "Let's Build" (feat. Chace Infinite, JFK, Mitchy Slick & Wais P)
11. "Smoke On" (feat. Dom Kennedy & Strong Arm Steady)
12. "The High Life" (feat. Kali, Isaac Castor & Chris Webby)
13. "Half Moon Part" (feat. Skyzoo, Chuuwee & Tayyib Ali)
14. "Black Swan" (feat. Nitty Scott, MC & Rapsody)
15. "Harlem Blues" (feat. Smoke DZA)
16. "Gold In 3D" (feat. STS & Dosage)
17. "Damn Right" (feat. Joell Ortiz & Brother Ali)
18. "Live & Let Live" (feat. Lecrae)
19. "A DJ Saved My Life" (feat. DJ Premier, DJ Babu, Scram Jones & DJ Caze)
20. "4Gs" (feat. Ea$y Money, Termanology, Scram Jones, & Wais P)

Statik Selektah & Action Bronson – Well-Done
01. "Respect the Mustache"
02. "Time for Some" (feat. Lil' Fame)
03. "Cocoa Butter" (feat. Nina Sky)
04. "White Silk"
05. "Keep Off The Grass"
06. "The Stick-Up"
07. "Central Bookings" (feat. Meyhem Lauren)
08. "Cirque de Soleil"
09. "The Rainmaker"
10. "Love Letter"
11. "Not Enough Words"
12. "Terror Death Camp" (feat. Meyhem Lauren, Maffew Ragazino, & AG Da Coroner)
13. "Miss Fordham Road (86 87 88)"
14. "Cliff Notes"
15. "Bon Voyage"

Chris Webby – There Goes The Neighborhood
09. "Take Me Home"

2012

Raekwon – Unexpected Victory
16. "Gangsta Cazas" (feat. JD Era, Camoflauge, & Styles P)

Disiz – Lucide
01. "Toussa, Toussa"

Obie Trice – Bottoms Up
05. "Richard" (feat. Eminem)

Sixfeet
00. "Alternativ Dogma" (feat. Big P)

Reks – Straight, No Chaser
01. "Autographs"
02. "Sit/Think/Drink"
03. "Power Lines" (feat. Ea$y Money)
04. "Riggs & Murtaugh" (feat. Action Bronson)
05. "Such a Showoff" (feat. Kali, JFK, & Termanology)
06. "Cancel That" (feat. Wais P)
07. "Parenthood"
08. "Break Ups" (feat. C-Sharp)
09. "Chasin'"
10. "Sins" (feat. Alias)
11. "Straight, No Chaser" (feat. Slaine)
12. "Lost In Translation"
13. "Regrets"
14. "730"

1982 – 2012
01. "2012"
02. "Lights Down"
03. "Up Every Night"
04. "Shining"
05. "Happy Days" (feat. Mac Miller, Bun B, & Shawn Stockman)
06. "Too Long"
07. "Time Travellin'"
08. "82 Was The Year (Interlude)"
09. "Thug Poets" (feat. Roc Marciano & Havoc)
10. "Right Now"
11. "Everything"
12. "Hard To Forget"
13. "Make It Out Alive" (feat. Freddie Gibbs  & Crooked I)
14. "Live It Up" (feat. Lil' Fame)
15. "Time Ticking"

Joey Badass – 1999
12. "Don't Front" (feat. CJ Fly)

La Coka Nostra – Masters of the Dark Arts
01. "My Universe" (feat. Vinnie Paz)

Strong Arm Steady & Statik Selektah – Stereotype
01. "Truth of The Truth"
02. "Premium"
03. "Forever" (feat. Chace Infinite)
04. "Born Into It" (feat. Bad Lucc)
05. "Do Ya Thang Girl (JOOK)" (feat. Casey Veggies & Picaso)
06. "On My Job" (feat. Skeme)
07. "LA Blues" (feat. Planet Asia & Tri-State)
08. "Classic"
09. "Through The Motions" (feat. David Banner & Fiend)
10. "Married To The Game" (feat. Chace Infinite & Double R)
11. "Fair Fight" (feat. Ab-Soul, ScHoolboy Q, & Jay Rock)
12. "Back On Up"
13. "Outta Control" (feat. Reks)
14. "Smoke On" (feat. Dom Kennedy & Baby D)

Bumpy Knuckles & Statik Selektah – Ambition
01. Still Got It
02. Animalistic
03. Lyrical Workout (feat. N.O.R.E.)
04. Put The Beats On 'Em
05. Not What I Say
06. Don't Do Fake
07. Blast Yourself
08. Beat It Up
09. Pen Game
10. Who Did The Beat!?
11. Rock Solid
12. Ambition
13. For You
14. The Grand Finale
15. Pen Still Killa
16. Mic Bless'n Gun Press'n Impress'n (feat. O.C.)
17. Hear The Call
18. Just Rock'n Wit Bump
19. Find Urself

Freddie Gibbs – Baby Face Killa
09. "Krazy" (feat. Jadakiss & Jay Rock)
19. "Breaking Bad" (feat. Ea$y Money)

Sean Price – Mic Tyson
17. "Remember" (feat. Freddie Gibbs)

Termanology & Lil' Fame – Fizzyology
05. "From the Streets" (feat. Freeway)
14. "Crazy" (feat. M.O.P.)
15. "Thuggathon"

Pro Era – P.E.E.P: The aPROcalypse
01. "Like Water"
04. "F A Rap Critic"
07. "Interlude 47"

2013

Raekwon – Lost Jewlry
01. "A Kings Chariot (Intro)"

Curren$y – New Jet City
02. "Clear" (feat. Jadakiss)

Jared Evan & Statik Selektah – Boom Bap & Blues
01. "Blue"
02. "Uma Thurman" (feat. Lil' Fame)
03. "The Devil Wears Prada"
04. "Black & White" (feat. Joey Bada$$)
05. "Pro Create" (feat. Action Bronson)
06. "Television" (feat. Wais P)
07. "Toast" (feat. Hoodie Allen)
08. "Night Light" (feat. Termanology)
09. "Are We Almost There Yet?"
10. "Sunday"
11. "Bad News"

Havoc – 13
13. "Can't Sleep"

AZ
00. "We Movin'"

Statik Selektah – Extended Play
01. "Reloaded" (feat. Pain In Da Ass, Action Bronson, Big Body Bes, Termanology, & Tony Touch)
02. "Bird's Eye View" (feat. Raekwon, Joey Badass, & Black Thought)
03. "East Coast" (feat. N.O.R.E. & Lil' Fame)
04. "21 & Over" (feat. Sean Price & Mac Miller)
05. "The Spark" (feat. Action Bronson, Joey Badass, & Mike Posner)
06. "Make Believe" (feat. Freddie Gibbs, Ea$y Money, & Termanology)
07. "Pinky Ring" (feat. Prodigy)
08. "Funeral Season" (feat. Styles P, Bun B, & Hit-Boy)
09. "Bring 'Em Up Dead" (feat. Joell Ortiz)
10. "Camouflage Dons" (feat. Smif-n-Wessun & Flatbush Zombies)
11. "Big City of Dreams" (feat. Troy Ave, Push! Montana, Meyhem Lauren, & AG da Coroner)
12. "Gz, Pimps, Hustlers" (feat. Wais P & Slaine)
13. "My Hoe" (feat. Blu, Evidence, & Reks)
14. "Love & War" (feat. Ea$y Money & Freeway)
15. "100 Stacks" (feat. JFK & Strong Arm Steady)
16. "Live From The Era" (feat. Pro Era) (co-produced by The Alchemist)
17. "Game Break" (feat. Lecrae, Termanology, & Posdnuos)
18. "Home" (feat. Talib Kweli)

Black Dave – Stay Black 2
12. "Back Up On My Bullshit" (feat. William Wilson)

Joey Bada$$ – Summer Knights
08. "Word Is Bond"

Astro – Starvin Like Marvin For A Cool J Song
02. "Didn't Know
05. "Stranger" (feat. Skyzoo)
07. "War (Interlude)" (feat. Wordspit The Illest)
08. "Lisa"

Tony Touch – The Piece Maker 3: Return of the 50 MC's
18. "A Queen's Thing" (feat. Action Bronson & Kool G Rap)

Statik Selektah & Ransom – The Proposal
01. "I Do"
02. "Unexplainable (feat. Ea$y Money)
03. "Outcast"
04. "Life of Sin"
05. "How It Feels"
06. "Jade"
07. "1996"
08. "It's Ransom" (feat. Styles P)
09. "Reservoir Scars"
10. "Start To Finish"
11. "Never Forget" (feat. Termanology)
12. "Dollars & Sense"

CJ Fly – Thee Way Eye See It
04. "Day zZz's"

Scoe – Tha Influence
17. "Somebody's Gotta Win"

Onyx
00. "We Get Live" (feat. Myster DL)

Serial Killers – Serial Killers Vol. 1
07. "Legends Never Die"

H Blanco
00. "Blessed"

Styles P
00. "All I Got" (feat. Action Bronson & Ea$y Money)

Anarchy – DGKA (Dirty Ghetto King Anarchy)
09. "Loyalty"

Dead Heat – DBKPC
04. "My Illusion" (feat. Slaine)

Talib Kweli – Gravitas
06. "New Leaders" (feat. The Underachievers)

Troy Ave – White Christmas 2
09. "Glitter and Gold"

Scoe – Tha Influence 2: X-Mas Treez
14. "Ooo Child"

Demrick
00. "Purple" (feat. Mistah F.A.B.)

2014

Chris Gatsby – Middleground Morals & Money
03. "Keep It Moving"

Statik Selektah
00. "Welcome To The NBA" (feat. JFK, Wais P, & Joey B)

Sammy Adams – WIZZY
08. "Loser" (feat. Jared Evan & Ea$y Money)

Ab-Soul
00. "To The Max"

Mick Jenkins – The Water[s]
08. "Black Sheep"

The Underachievers – Cellar Door: Terminus Ut Exordium
03. "Radiance"

Statik Selektah – ...Comes Around EP
01. "Hard 2 Explain" (feat. Al-Doe, Termanology, Chris Rivers)
02. "Break" (feat. Astro)
03. "4 Brothers" (feat. LA the Darkman, Willie the Kid, Termanology)
04. "Nothing" (feat. Raven Sorvino, Chauncy Sherod)
05. "What you Need" (feat. Chris Miles)
06. "The Finish Line" (feat. brandUn DeShay, Alex Wiley)

Statik Selektah – What Goes Around
01. "What Goes Around" (feat. Lil' Fame & Ea$y Money)
02. "Carry On" (feat. Joey Bada$$ & Freddie Gibbs)
03. "The Thrill Is Back" (feat. Styles P & Talib Kweli)
04. "The Imperial" (feat. Action Bronson, Royce Da 5'9", & Black Thought)
05. "All The Way (Pimp Hop)" (feat. Snoop Dogg, Wais P, Ransom, & Chauncy Sherod)
06. "Back For You" (feat. Dilated Peoples)
07. "Alarm Clock" (feat. Ab-Soul, Jon Connor, & Logic)
08. "My Time" (feat. Black Dave, CJ Fly, Nyck Caution, & Josh Xantus)
09. "Fugazi" (feat. Sincere)
10. "Long Time" (feat. Action Bronson)
11. "Drunk & High" (feat. N.O.R.E., Termanology, & Reks)
12. "The Chopper" (feat. Jon Connor & Ransom)
13. "Down Like This" (feat. Sheek Louch, Pharoahe Monch, & Crooked I)
14. "Slum Villain" (feat. Joey Bada$$)
15. "Heltah Selektah" (feat. Heltah Skeltah)
16. "Overdose" (feat. B-Real & JFK)
17. "Something To Cry For" (feat. Boldy James)
18. "Rise Above" (feat. Astro & Dessy Hinds)
19. "Get Away" (feat. Joe Scudda & Colin Munroe)
20. "God Knows" (feat. Bun B, Jared Evan, & Posdnuos)
Bonus Track (feat. Kool Keith)

Jared Evan & Statik Selektah – Still Blue 
01. "Still Blue"
02. "Scene"
03. "Baggage Claim" (feat. Michael Christmas)
04. "Moneyball" (feat. Nyck Caution & Dessy Hinds)
05. "When in Rome"
06. "The Background"
07. "Bass Is Low"
08. "Outside" (feat. Ransom)
09. "Layover"
10. "No One Else"

Shady Records – Shady XV 
12. "Detroit vs. Everybody" (feat. Eminem, Royce da 5'9", Big Sean, Danny Brown, Dej Loaf, & Trick-Trick)

Chris Miles
00. "Topic Of Discussion"

Termanology – Shut Up And Rap
15. "El Wave" (feat. Willie The Kid & Reks) (co-produced by The Alchemist)

2015

JFK
00. "Betrayal" (feat. Wade Barber)

Chatham The Sun
00. "Somethin For You & You" (feat. Mr. Cheeks)

Joey Bada$$
00. "Born Day (AquariUS)"

Joey Bada$$ – B4.Da.$$
01. "Save The Children"
09. "No. 99"
15. "Curry Chicken"
16. "Run Up On Ya" (feat. Action Bronson and Elle Varner)

Kool Keith
00. "My Sons"

Action Bronson – Mr. Wonderful
01. “Brand New Car” (co-produced with Mark Ronson)
02. "The Rising" (feat. Big Body Bes)

Millyz – SPED
04. "Substance"

Dessy Hinds
00. "Homecoming"

Your Old Droog
00. "Unlimited Metrocard"

Rick Gonzalez – Divine Mechanics 
11. "Love & Money" (feat. Prodigy)

Ea$y Money – The Motive of Nearly Everybody, Yo
01. "Ea$y"
04. "All Been Waiting"
05. "For the Streets" (feat. Termanology)
06. "Hit the Fan" (feat. Lil' Fame & Chauncy Sherod)
07. "Go Time" (feat. Action Bronson)
08. "Connected" (feat. Rob White, Wais P & Joey Badass)
11. "The M.O.N.E.Y."
12. "Took It All Away" (feat. Jared Evan) (co-produced by Antman Wonder)

Ape The Grim – The Idealist
09. "Stetson Hats" (feat. Kool Keith)

Statik Selektah – Lucky 7
1. "Intro" (feat. Hannibal Buress)
2. "Another Level" (feat. Rapsody)
3. "Beautiful Life" (feat. Action Bronson & Joey Bada$$)
4. "Hood Boogers" (feat. Your Old Droog & Chauncy Sherod)
5. "The Locker Room" (feat. Dave East)
6. "In the Wind" (feat. Joey Bada$$, Big K.R.I.T., & Chauncy Sherod)
7. "Crystal Clear" (feat. Royce Da 5'9")
8. "How You Feel" (feat. Mick Jenkins)
9. "Murder Game" (feat. Smif-n-Wessun, Young M.A, & Buckshot)
10. "Gentlemen" (feat. Illa Ghee, Sean Price, & Lil'Fame) 
11. "Bodega!" (feat. Bodega Bamz)
12. "The Trophy Room" (feat. Skyzoo, Ea$y Money, Domo Genesis, & Masspike Miles)
13. "Sucker Free" (feat. JFK)
14. "Wall Flowers" (feat. Your Old Droog, Termanology, & Lord Sear)
15. "Top Tier" (feat. Sean Price, Bun B, & Styles P)
16. "Silver Lining" (feat. A$AP Twelvyy, Kirk Knight, & Chauncy Sherod)
17. "Cold" (feat. Wais P & Jared Evan)
18. "All You Need" (feat. Action Bronson, Ab-Soul, & Elle Varner)
19. "Scratch Off" (feat. CJ Fly, Talib Kweli, & Cane)
20. "Alone" (feat. Joey Bada$$)
21. "Harley's Blues"

Capone-N-Noreaga – Lessons
12. "Now" (feat. Tragedy Khadafi)

Sean Price
00. "Admiral Meets General" (feat. Jakk Frost)

Termanology – Term Brady EP
04. "Spit Real Game" (feat. Ransom)
07. "World Tour"

Typ iLL – Veterans Day
01. "Hennessy Lane"
02. "Typ Statik"
03. "Around Here"
04. "The Hustle"
05. "Onyx"
06. "Dog Tags & Duffle Bags"
07. "Soldier"
08. "Let Em Talk"
09. "Arielle"
10. "Support Ya Troop"

Bless – Spoils Of War
07. "Pop Off"

Various Artists – Prosto Mixtape Cztery
12. "Pierwszy Walkman" (Bialas, Obywatel MC, & VNM)

Black Thought
00. "Couldn't Tell"

2016

Progress – U Ain't Hip 
03. "Lord Forgive 'Em" (feat. Ransom & Ea$y Money)

Statik KXNG (Statik Selektah & KXNG Crooked) 
00. "February 12th (Part 1)"
00. "February 12th (Part 2)"

Statik KXNG (Statik Selektah & KXNG Crooked) – Statik KXNG
01. "I Hear Voices"
02. "Magic & Bird"
03. "Lost a Fan"
04. "Everybody Know"
05. "Dead or in Jail"
06. "Stop Playing"
07. "Good Gone Bad"
08. "Let's Go" (feat. Termanology)
09. "Bitch Got Me Fucked Up"
10. "Brand New Shit"

Joey Bada$$ 
00. "Ready"
00. "Brooklyn's Own"

Westside Gunn – FLYGOD
13. "50 Inch Zenith" (feat. Skyzoo)

Cane – The Dark Hours 
01. "Take Time" (feat. Termanology)

Conway 
00. "Birdy"

Concise Kilgore – Kil Joy Division
06. "GB1B" (feat. Rasco)

Various Artists – Meet the Blacks (Soundtrack)
06. "Street Music" (as Statik KXNG)

SuperSTah Snuk – Man Of 1,000 Styles 
03. "Falling In Love"

Foul Monday – I Hate Monday
15. "Skid Row" (feat. Metta World Peace, Mr. Challace, & Ruc Mr. QB)

Statik Selektah & 2 Chainz
00. "Smoke Break"

Prodigy
00. "Live From Bushwick" (feat. Big Twins) (co-produced by The Alchemist)

Jarren Benton – Slow Motion Vol. 2 
16. "Miss You"

Big Kurt – M.A.B.U.S. – The Serious Business Mixtape Vol. 3
12. "The Gate Keepers" (feat. Reks, King Spyda, Esoteric, Slaine, & Termanology)

Jabee – Black Future
12. "Exhausted"

Reks – The Greatest X 
02. "A.N.O.N.Y.M.O.U.S"
16. "Pray for Me: The Genocide Note"

Ras Kass – Intellectual Property
18. "Promised Land"

Statik Selektah 
00. "Love Changes"

Grafh 
00. "Rah Rah"

La Coka Nostra – To Thine Own Self Be True
05. "Stay True"

Randy Reimer & Wade Barber 
00. "Heroin Man"

Termanology – More Politics
06. "Let's Go (Part 2)" (feat. KXNG Crooked) 
07. "Top Shotta" (feat. Joey Bada$$)
09. "First Love" (feat. Sean Taylor)
10. "The Last Time"
11. "Moving Forward" (feat. Kendra Foster)
12. "The Curve" (feat. Westside Gunn, Conway the Machine, & Your Old Droog)
13. "Bar Show" (feat. Ea$y Money & Chris Rivers)

Various Artists – A3C Vol. 6
22. "Free" (Oswin Benjamin)

Various Artists –  The Best of A3C (Remixed by Statik Selektah) 
01. Muslim Wedding (Statik Selektah Remix) (Action Bronson)
02. Stretched Out (Statik Selektah Remix) (Dave East)
03. 3hree Kings (Statik Selektah Remix) (The Underachievers feat. Freeway)
04. Skitzo (Statik Selektah Remix) (Jarren Benton)
05. Rebel (Statik Selektah Remix) (G-Eazy)
06. Victory (Statik Selektah Remix) (Moosh & Twist)
07. Vicodin (Statik Selektah Remix) (Vince Staples)
08. Free Nation Rebel Soldier 2 (Statik Selektah Remix) (Mick Jenkins)
09. Salty (Statik Selektah Remix) (Michael Christmas)
10. Man Down (Statik Selektah Remix) (The Great Outdoors)

Frank Castle – B.U.T.T.E.R.
10. "Prepare 4 The Worst"

2017

Randy Reimer 
00. "Roll Up" (feat. Slaine)

Wiki & Your Old Droog – What Happened To Fire?
03. "Vigilantes"

KuuL 
00. "L.W.L. (Link With Legend)"

Crimeapple 
00. "Damage Control"

Joey Bada$$ – All-Amerikkkan Badass 
09. "Super Predator" (feat. Styles P)
11. "Legendary" (feat. J. Cole)

ANoyd – A Time And Place
05. "Name Brand Water" (co-produced by Jake One and Swish)

Joyner Lucas – 508-507-2209
09. "Way To Go" (feat. Snoh Aalegra) (co-produced by Boi-1da)

Typ iLL – 30 Days
02. "Let It Bang (30 Days)"

The Burn Unit (Statik Selektah, Smoke DZA, Trademark Da Skydiver, & Young Roddy) – The Burn Unit
00. "How Many?"

Joey Bada$$ 
00. "Love Is Only A Feeling"
00. "Too Lit"
00. "500 Benz"

ST. da Squad – Self Titled
03. "Definition"
09. "It's The ST. 2.0 (Let 'Em Know)"
15. "To The Beat"

T.O.N.Y 
00. "Gladiator School" (feat. Termanology)

Slaine & Termanology – Anti-Hero 
04. "Some Other Shit" (feat. Madchild)
06. "Land Of The Lost"
08. "Blink Of An Eye" (feat. Ras Kass)

Conway The Machine– More Steroids
08. "3 Bodies"

Pomer & Dirty Sanchez – Polo Palm Trees EP
01. "Couldn´t Relate"

Statik Selektah – 8
01. "Harley's Blues (The World Could Save)" (feat. Harley Harl & Francesca)
02. "Man Of The Hour" (feat. 2 Chainz & Wiz Khalifa)
03. "Put Jewels On It" (feat. Run the Jewels)
04. "Watching Myself" (feat. Action Bronson)
05. "Get Down" (feat. Wale & Phil Ade)
06. "Ain't a Damn Thing Change" (feat. G-Eazy, Joey Badass, & Enisa)
07. "But You Don't Hear Me Tho" (feat. The Lox & Mtume)
08. "No. 8" (feat. Conway The Machine, Westside Gunn, Termanology)
09. "What Can We Do (Parts 1 & 2)" (feat. ANoyd, Crimeapple, Avenue, Nick Grant, Millyz, & Chris Rivers)
10. "Don't Run" (feat. Joyner Lucas)
11. "Go Gettas" (feat. Wais P, Sean Price, & Tek)
12. "Slept to Death" (feat. Curren$y & Cousin Stizz)
13. "Everything (Show Me Love)" (feat. PnB Rock & Lil Fame)
14. "Nobody Move" (feat. Raekwon & Royce da 5'9")
15. "Shakem Up" (feat. B-Real & Everlast)
16. "Pull the Curtain Back" (feat. No Malice)
17. "Disrespekt" (feat. Prodigy) (co-produced by The Alchemist)
18. "All Said & Done /// (JFK's 8 Ball Outro)" (feat. Plays & Juelz Santana)

Rigz – I Got Samples
12. "None Of Dat"

2018

MC WhiteOwl – Born Yesterday
02. "One Chance"
06. "Slave" (feat. Serge Boogie)
08. "No Interference" (feat. Akbar & Rhinoceros Funk)

Quadir Lateef – Ugly Face EP
02. "Slave Hands To Shaved Grams"
03. "I Ain't Lettin Go"
05. "The Healing"
06. "Real Men Cry Too"
08. "The Exorcism"

Jaysaun - Kill Ya Boss 
15. "Kings"

Westside Gunn – Supreme Blientele
15. "WESTSIDE"

Termanology – Bad Decisions
01. "Take 'Em Back"
04. "Passport Kingz" (feat. Raekwon)

Millyz & Statik Selektah – Saints X Sinners
01. "Let It Go" (feat. Jadakiss)
02. "Pick 'Em' Up"
03. "Addiction" (feat. Dyce Payne)
04. "Frost Bite"
05. "Glum" (feat. Annalese)
06. "My Old Life" (feat. Termanology)
07. "F.a.M.I.L.Y."
08. "Life's Deeper"
09. "Like the Way It Feel"
10. "Communion"

Conway the Machine – Everybody Is F.O.O.D.
09. "Sky Joint 2" (feat. Skyzoo)

Dirty Sanchez – New Yuck City
02. "Heavy Thinker"

St. Da Squad - Self-Titled 
03. "Definition"
09. "It´s the St. 2.0 (Let Em´ know)"
15. "To the Beat"

1982 – Still 1982
01. "6 Years Later (Intro)"
02. "Still" (feat. Kendra Foster)
03. "Just Can't Let Go"
04. "30 Shots" (feat. Chris Rivers & Conway the Machine)
05. "Haunted" (feat. UFO Fev)
06. "Fuck Ya Lyfestyle" (feat. Nems & Beamz)
07. "Crimeology" (feat. Crimeapple)
08. "It's On You" (feat. Lil Fame & Haile Supreme)
09. "Party Crashers (Interlude)"
10. "Never Let My City Down" (feat. Mtume)
11. "Different Now" (feat. CJ Fly)
12. "Do It On My Own"

Pro Era – P.E.E.P: The aPROcalypse (Re-Release)
18. "Know the Rules"

2019

Mass Appeal – Starting 5: Vol. 1
01. "Apostles" (Fashawn, Nas, Ezri)

Big.D & Easy Mo Bee - This is my Life 
08. "Reach out" (feat. Darkim Allah)

Raz Fresco - Baking Instructions: Recipe #1 
13. "Choose Sides (U-N-I)"

Statik Selektah – Mahalo
01. "For Your Love"
02. "Faze Won"
03. "Movin In"
04. "South Seas"
05. "Tropic Lights"
06. "Lay Low"
07. "I Remember"
08. "Interlood Mood"
09. "Pair a Dice"
10. "Exotik"
11. "Moana Mall"
12. "You Win"
13. "Day Dreaming Outro"

Plays & Statik Selektah - Piecework 
01. "First 48"
02. "Steppin"
03. "Bravo" (feat. Juelz Santana)
04. "Self made" (feat. Neem)
05. "Fired"
06. "Sunday School"
07. "We on" (feat. Termanology)
08. "I know" (feat. Zar)
09. "Said and done" (feat. Juelz Santana)
10. "We made it"

Bobby J From Rockaway - Summer Classics 
 02. "Walter White”
 09. "Blue Eyed Soul"

Bun B & Statik Selektah – TrillStatik
01. "Moving Mountains" (feat. Jovanie)
02. "Still Trill" (feat. Method Man & Grafh)
03. "Basquiat" (feat. Fat Joe & Smoke DZA)
04. "Concrete" (feat. Westside Gunn & Termanology)
05. "Money" (feat. Lil Fame & Wais P)
06. "Superstarr" (feat. Meechy Darko, CJ Fly, & Haile Supreme)
07. "Paperwork" (feat. Uncle Murda)
08. "T.B.A." (feat. Propain & Killa Kyleon)
09. "Time Flies" (feat. Big K.R.I.T. & Talib Kweli)
10. "I Know" (feat. Haile Supreme)
11. "All Good" (feat. Tobe Nwigwe)
12. "Jon Snow" (feat. Paul Wall & Le$)
13. "Lemons"
14. "How the Game Go"

Wiz Khalifa – Fly Times Vol. 1: The Good Fly Young
09. "Gold Bottles" (feat. Young Deji) (co-produced by Marv4MoBeats)
10. "Taylor Life" (feat. Sosamann) (co-produced by Dreamlife Beats)

Rome Streetz - Noise Kandy 3: The Overdose 
04. "World in my Palm"

Curren$y & Statik Selektah – Gran Turismo 
01. "Theme Music"
02. "Clear Pt. 2" (feat. Jadakiss)
03. "Nothin´New" (feat. Haile Supreme & Wiz Khalifa)
04. "At Night" (feat. Haile Supreme & Jim Jones)
05. "Dirty World"
06. "Nothin´Less" (feat. YBN Cordae)
07. "Gran Turismo" (feat. Termanology)
08. "Friend or Foe"
09. "Outside"
10. "Forever"

ANoyd & Statik Selektah - Yuck! 
01. "Yuck!" (feat. Haile Supreme)
02. "The Mood"
03. "Purple"
04. "New Legends" (feat. Nick Grant)
05. "Mama Porch"
06. "Kilos" (feat. Termanology & UFO Fev)
07. "Someone like me"
08. "Already"
09. "Tomorrow"
10. "Darks & Lights"

Nas – Lost Tapes 2 
04. "Lost Freestyle"

Conway The Machine - Look What I Became 
09. "You Made It" (feat. Amber Simone)

Big Kahuna OG & Fly Anakin 
00. "Mood Swings"

Radamiz - Nothing Changes If Nothing Changes 
09. "Fake Gucci" (co-produced by Vintage Vandals)

Westside Gunn -  Hitler Wears Hermes VII 
07. "Kelly´s Korner" (feat. Fat Joe)

Paul Wall & Statik Selektah - Give Thanks 
01. "What it do"
02. "Mind blowin" (feat. B-Real)
03. "Stop me" (feat. CJ Fly)
04. "Overcame" (feat. Benny The Butcher)
05. "Part of the Game" (feat. Nems & Haile Supreme)
06. "R U willin" (feat. Termanology & Mia Jae)
07. "Sea the Shore" (feat. Haile Supreme)

Stunna Gang & Statik Selektah - Powerful Musik 
01. "God Body Tendency"
02. "Awesome" 
03. "In the Ruff" (feat. Haile Supreme)
04. "The Gangman" 
05. "Reaper" (feat. Haile Supreme)
06. "No Squares" (feat. Haile Supreme)
07. "Powerful Musik"

Termanology - Vintage Horns 
04. "Nobody" (feat. Eto & Tek)
06. "Signs" (feat. Wais P & Haile Supreme)
07. "Lost in my Pain" (feat. 38 Spesh & Simba Selassie)

2020

Wais P – Chinchilla 
01. "You Never Know" (feat. Haile Supreme)
02. "So Easy" (feat. Termanology)
03. "Time Is Money"
04. "My Lane"
05. "RNL"
06. "No Rules" (feat. Nems)
07. "Walk On By"
08. "Mourn" (feat. Paul Wall)

UFO Fev & Statik Selektah - Fresh Air 
01. "Fresh Air"
02. "Golden Soul"
03. "On My Way" (feat. Jose Santiago)
04. "Clean Up" (feat. Haile Supreme)
05. "Bad Luck"
06. "Slow Dancing"
07. "Hard Rock" (feat. Termanology, Ransom & Eto)
08. "One Time"
09. "Not Today" (feat. Haile Supreme)
10. "Only A Dream"

G. Huff & Lena Jackson 
00. "Another Dead Rapper" (feat. M.O.P.) (Statik Selektah Remix)

Smoke DZA - A Closed Mouth Don‘t Get Fed 
05. "Brick On My Neck"

CJ Fly & Statik Selektah - Rudebwoy 
01. "Goin Thru" (feat. T´Nah)
02. "Rudebwoy" (feat. Joey Bada$$)
03. "Barrell" (feat. Haile Supreme)
04. "Grew Up" (feat. Haile Supreme)
05. "Show You"
06. "I Tried" (feat. Oshun)
07. "Block Party" (feat. Kirk Knight)
08. "City We From" (feat. Conway the Machine)
09. "Jooks"
10. "LV Ascot"
11. "Strugglin"
12. "Hard Times" (feat. Lexipaz)
13. "The Pros" (feat. Pro Era)

1982 (Termanology & Statik Selektah) - The Quarantine 
01. "Pandemic"
02. "Relatable" (feat. Kota the Friend, CJ Fly)
03. "Another Day" (feat. UFO Fev, Marlon Craft)
04. "This Too Shall Pass" (feat. Grafh, Haile Supreme)
05. "Love Don´t Stop" (feat. Nems)
06. "All Facts"
07. "Morphine" (feat. Lil Fame)
08. "Walk With Me" (feat. Tek, Lil Fame)
09. "You Kno What Time It Is" (feat. JFK)
10. "Does It All Even Matter" (feat. Allan Kingdom)

Slik Jack - Dicey Business 
01. "Smoked Salmon Bagel"
02. "Capo" (feat. Poli, Blaq Poet)
03. "No Introductions" (feat. Edo G)
04. "Armani Suit" (feat. Rico Blox)
05. "Bad Moon Rise"
06. "GrindState" (feat. Chuck Strangers, Pacewon)
07. "Movin In"
08. "Air It Out" (feat. Don Streat)
09. "Livin Darkness" (feat. Bub Styles)
10. "Armani Suit (Remix)" (feat. Rico Blox)

Eto - The Beauty Of It 
06. "Rusty Stainless" (feat. Willie the Kid, Rome Streetz)

Jabee - "This World Is So Fragile And Cruel I´m Glad I Got You" 
09. "Checcmate" (feat. Slug, Lil B)
12. "Our Sons" (feat. Trishes)

The Notorious B.I.G. 
00. "Bastard Child" (Unreleased)

Bobby J From Rockaway - Endless Summer 
01. "You Know the Vibes"
02. "Where I’m From"
03. "Moonlight"
04. "Ungrateful" (feat. Haile Supreme)
05. "Autumn Leaves"

Rockwelz & John Jigg$ - Night Flex In L.E.S. 
09. "Classy Dons"

Wiz Khalifa - Big Pimpin 
02. "Slim Peter"

Joey Bada$$ - The Light Pack 
01. "The Light"
03. "Shine"

Nyck Caution - Open Flame EP 
03. "Margot Robbie"

Liam Tracy  
00. "Heartless"

Skkool - Beignets 2 
01. "Caviar"
02. "Brainstormin"
03. "Spoken Game"
04. "Unsettled"
05. "Zoom In"

JFK & Wade Barber - The Growth 
01. "Elements"
02. "The Growth"
03. "Rock Bottom" (feat. Paul Wall)
04. "In Your Area"
05. "Legends"
06. "Eighteen" (feat. Millyz)
07. "Groundwork"
08. "Visualize"
09. "Better Days"
10. "Innovate"
11. "Say Goodbye"
12. "New Normal" (feat. Casino Cash)

The LOX - Living Off Xperience 
08. "Come Back"

Reks - T.H.I.N.G.S. (The Hunger Inside Never Gets Satisfied) 
05. "The Complex" (feat. Pharaohe Monch)

Kojoe, B.D., ELIONE & ¥ellow Bucks 
00. "T.K.N.Y."

Fat Beats Records - Baker's Dozen XIII 
04. "Watamu"

Smoke DZA - Homegrown 
06. "Bank Withdrawal" (feat. Tish Hyman, Numberz)
10. "Union Dues" (feat. NymLo, Berner)

Statik Selektah - The Balancing Act 
01. "The Healing" (feat. Black Thought)
02. "Keep It Moving" (feat. Nas, Joey Bada$$, Gary Clark Jr.)
03. "Play Around" (feat. Allan Kingdom, Killer Mike, 2 Chainz, Conway the Machine)
04. "Hard Living" (feat. Dave East, Method Man)
05. "Time" (feat. Jack Harlow)
06. "Watch Me" (feat. Joey Bada$$)
07. "America Is Cancelled" (feat. Termanology, Styles P, Jadakiss)
08. "No Substitute" (feat. Brady Watt, Paul Wall, Benny the Butcher)
09. "Off My Mind" (feat. Haile Supreme, Fly Anakin, Rome Streetz)
10. "Welcome To The Game" (feat. Kota the Friend, Marlon Craft, Haile Supreme)
11. "Soul Custody" (feat. Blu, Evidence)
12. "No More" (feat. Rim da Villin, Smoke DZA, Lil Fame)
13. "Ralph Lauren´s Closet" (feat. Sean Price, Thirstin Howl III)
14. "Balance Beam" (feat. JFK, CJ Fly, Nick Grant)
15. "Way Up" (feat. Haile Supreme, Havoc, Bun B)
16. "Immortal (feat. Harley Harl, Bobby Sessions)

Flash - I´ma Die A King 
04. "Just Another Body" (feat. Ransom, Lil Fame)

2021

Joey Bada$$ 
00. "Let It Breathe"

Papoose - January 
04. "I Wanna Know"
07. "Brave Thinker"

Chris Crack - Might Delete Later 
14. "Flip Phone Hangup" (feat. U.G.L.Y. Boy Modeling)

Slaine - The Things We Can't Forgive 
09. "The Things We Can't Forgive" (feat. Rike Hook)

Kipp Stone - Faygo Baby 
01. "Manic"

CJ Fly & Statik Selektah - Rudebwoy B Sides 
01. "Mami"
02. "Regardless"
03. "For A Cost/Cause"
04. "Goodbye"
05. "If I Had"
06. "Overwhelmed"

Ea$y Money & Fabeyon - BEYOND EA$Y 
02. "Money Can Buy"
08. "Peep The Language"
13. "Peep The Language (Remix)" (feat. Ransom, Nems, UFO Fev)

Kota the Friend - To Kill A Sunrise 
01. "WOLVES"
02. "HATE"
03. "The COLD"
04. "The LOVE"
05. "Go Now" (feat. Haile Supreme)
06. "What Ya Sayin"
07. "LIVE & Direct"
08. "Day Glow"
09. "SUNRISE"
10. "SUNSET"

Jake James 
00. "Celebration" (feat. Stacy Barthe)

Dirty Sanchez 
00. "Way Out" (feat. Nyck Caution)

Papoose - April 
03. "The Internet Is Gone"

Kooley High - Lazy Sunday EP 
04. "Lazy Sunday - Statik Selektah Remix" (feat. Melanie Charles)

Lou From Paradise - Not Dead Yet 
01. "Brainless"
02. "Not Dead Yet"
03. "Anitfreeze"
04. "Cold Shoulder"
05. "Outside Wit Psychoz"
06. "Stray Dog Freestyle"

1982 (Termanology & Statik Selektah) - The Summer EP 
01. "Summer In New York" (feat. Skyzoo, Jared Evan)
02. "Stay Fly" (feat. Bun B, C-Scharp)
03. "Close To Me" (feat. Sammy Adams, Mia Jae)

Marlon Craft - Homecourt Advantage Vol. 1 
09. "Dead-Ish"

Def Jam - The One And Only Dick Gregory 
07. "Get Down" (feat. Talib Kweli, Haile Supreme)

Trilly Trills 
00. "El Puerto (Butter)"

Ea$y Money - Ea$y Money Presents... Gwapi Chulo 
04. "Better Together" (feat. Termanology)

Wais P - T.A.P.A.S. 2 
02. "Pimp Cup" (feat. Ransom)
06. "Clubber Lang" (feat. Paul Wall, Termanology, Kxng Crooked)

UFO Fev - Prayer, Weed & Music 
07. "Bout Them Dollas" (feat. Anoyd)

Mic North 
00. "Sacrifice"

Russ - Chomp 2 
12. "Get It" (feat. Lloyd Banks, CyHi The Prynce)

JFK - 21 Bridges 
01. "21 Bridges (Intro)"
02. "Danger" (feat. C Wells)
03. "Can´t Lie To God" (feat. Destruct)
04. "Right Or Wrong" (feat. Nash Boogie, Big Dese)
05. "Time To Collect"
06. "Against Us"
07. "Fetty Pills"
08. "Get Up"
09. "Sorry" (feat. Casino Cash)

Justin Tyme 
00. "Anti Dope" (feat. Stove God Cooks, Styles P)

2022

AZ - Doe or Die II (Deluxe Version)
15. "Motorola Era" (feat. 2 Chainz)
17. "This Is Mine"

Death Row Records - Dogg on it: Death Row Mixtape Vol. 1 (NFT) 
00. "Scared 2 Death" (feat. Millyz)

Lyfe Crisis - Lost Cauze 
01. "Move Away"
02. "Voices" (feat. Mr. Ent)
05. "Here We Go" (feat. Mr. Ent)

Wade Barber - BARBER 
05. "Metaverse"
10. "Pay Homage"

Termanology & Paul Wall - Start 2 Finish 
01. "No Asterisk"
02. "Ask Permission"
05. "No Favors (Pt. 2)" (feat. C Scharp)
06. "Clubber Lang" (feat. Wais P, Kxng Crooked)
08. "No Tolerance" (feat. Fly Anakin, Nems)
10. "Step Outside" (feat. Millyz, Jared Evan)

Method Man 
00. "Come Get Some" (feat. PXWER, inTeLL)

OT The Real - Maxed out 
01. "Loyalty" (feat. Gillie Da Kid, Shaquille O'Neal, Wallo267)
02. "Make It Count"
03. "Revelations"
04. "Hardcore" (feat. Freeway)
05. "Turned On Me"
06. "The Bottom" (feat. Merkules)
07. "Treachery" (feat. G-Weeder)
08. "Windows"
09. "Came Up Fast"
10. "History"

Joey Bada$$ - 2000 
02. "Make Me Feel"
03. "Where I Belong"
06. "Eulogy"
08. "One Of Us" (feat. Larry June)
10. "Show Me"
12. "Head High"

Nym Lo 
00. "I Love The Game" (feat. Dave East)

Termanology - Determination 
01. "Determination" (feat. DJ Kay Slay)
09. "Take Me To The Plug" (feat. UFO Fev)
10. "Just Another Day" (feat. Fashawn)
13. "Cartier Aroma" (feat. Tragedy Khadafi)

IDK - W13 
01. "Drive"

Termanology - Rapping With My Friends 
04. "Put You On (Interlude)"
08. "Congratulations" (feat. Xp The Marxman, Solene)

Bun B & Statik Selektah - TrillStatik 2 
01. "Right Back At It"
02. "Building Bridges" (feat. Termanology, Paul Wall)
03. "In My Hand" (feat. Big K.R.I.T., Cal Wayne) 
04. "We Live" (feat. Dave East, Jinell)
05. "Devastating" (feat. Styles P, Propain)
06. "Every Hour" (feat. Nems, Papoose)
07. "Only Life I Know" (feat. Smoke DZA, Flee Lord, Haile Supreme)
08. "Acetone" (feat. Boldy James)
09. "Ain´t No Tellin" (feat. 38 Spesh, Grafh, Haile Supreme)
10. "There Comes A Time" (feat. Armand Assante)

JFK & Wade Barber - #AGE 
01. "Makaveli"
03. "Ghost Guns"
04. "Fadeaway"
05. "Lost"
06. "Somebody" (feat. Destruct)
07. "Not Afraid" (feat. Problemattik)
08. "Nostalgia"
09. "Stank (2012)" (feat. Statik Selektah)
10. "Contrarians"
12. "For The Moment (Outro)"

2023

Otis Oak 
00. "Class In Session"

Kota the Friend - Lyrics To Go, Vol. 4 
02. "Pennywise"
03. "Life Lessons"
04. "Vultures"

Casket D. - Calculated 
01. "Nasal Drip"
02. "Careless Whisper" (feat. COLTx)
03. "Pit Boss"
04. "The Math"

Dirty Sanchez 47 
00. "Last Strike"

SH4MEL 
00. "Bad News"

Kota the Friend - To See A Sunset 
01. "High Noon"
02. "Real Ones"
03. "Elevator"
04. "Go Brooklyn"
05. "Maybe So"
06. "One Life"
07. "Valleys"
08. "Eye See U"
09. "Free Not Woke"
10. "Thank You" (Bonus Track included)

Nym Lo 
00. "Exuma Island"
00. "A Kid From The Town" (feat. Curren$y)

Statik Selektah - Round Trip 
00. "Unpredictable" (feat. Inspectah Deck, Method Man, Raekwon, Ghostface Killah)

References

Production discographies